Porocystis is a genus of flowering plants belonging to the family Sapindaceae.

Its native range is Guianas to Northern Brazil.

Species:

Porocystis acuminata 
Porocystis toulicioides

References

Sapindaceae
Sapindaceae genera